Ubuntu releases are made semiannually by Canonical Ltd, the developers of the Ubuntu operating system, using the year and month of the release as a version number. The first Ubuntu release, for example, was Ubuntu 4.10 and was released on 20 October 2004. Consequently, version numbers for future versions are provisional; if the release is delayed until a different month (or even year) to that planned, the version number will change accordingly.

Canonical schedules Ubuntu releases to occur approximately one month after GNOME releases, resulting in each Ubuntu release including a newer version of GNOME.

Every fourth release, occurring in the second quarter of even-numbered years, has been designated as a long-term support (LTS) release. The desktop version of LTS releases for 10.04 and earlier were supported for three years, with server version support for five years. LTS releases 12.04 and newer are freely supported for five years. Through the ESM paid option, support can be extended even longer, up to a total of ten years for 18.04. The support period for non-LTS releases is 9 months. Prior to 13.04, it had been 18 months.

Naming convention 
Ubuntu releases are also given code names, using an adjective and an animal with the same first letter – an alliteration, e.g., "Dapper Drake". With the exception of the first two releases, code names are in alphabetical order, and except for the first three releases, the first letters are sequential, allowing a quick determination of which release is newer. As of Ubuntu 17.10, however, the initial letter "rolled over" and returned to "A". Names are occasionally chosen so that animal appearance or habits reflects some new feature, e.g., "Koala's favourite leaf is Eucalyptus"; see below. Ubuntu releases are often referred to using only the adjective portion of the code name, e.g., "Feisty".

Release history

Ubuntu 4.10 (Warty Warthog) 

Ubuntu 4.10 (Warty Warthog), released on 20 October 2004, was Canonical's first release of Ubuntu, building upon Debian, with plans for a new release every six months and eighteen months of support thereafter. Ubuntu 4.10's support ended on 30 April 2006. Ubuntu 4.10 was offered as a free download and, through Canonical's ShipIt service, was also mailed to users free of charge in CD format.

Ubuntu 5.04 (Hoary Hedgehog) 

Ubuntu 5.04 (Hoary Hedgehog), released on 8 April 2005, was Canonical's second release of Ubuntu. Ubuntu 5.04's support ended on 31 October 2006. Ubuntu 5.04 added many new features including an Update Manager, upgrade notifier, readahead and grepmap, suspend, hibernate and standby support, dynamic frequency scaling for processors, Ubuntu hardware database, Kickstart installation, and APT authentication. Ubuntu 5.04 was the first version that allowed installation from USB devices. Beginning with Ubuntu 5.04, UTF-8 became the default character encoding.

Ubuntu 5.10 (Breezy Badger) 

Ubuntu 5.10 (Breezy Badger), released on 12 October 2005, was Canonical's third release of Ubuntu. Ubuntu 5.10's support ended on 13 April 2007. Ubuntu 5.10 added several new features including a graphical bootloader (Usplash), an Add/Remove Applications tool, a menu editor (Alacarte), an easy language selector, logical volume management support, full Hewlett-Packard printer support, OEM installer support, a new Ubuntu logo in the top-left, and Launchpad integration for bug reporting and software development.

Ubuntu 6.06 LTS (Dapper Drake) 

Ubuntu 6.06 (Dapper Drake), released on 1 June 2006, was Canonical's fourth release, and the first long-term support (LTS) release. Ubuntu 6.06 was released behind schedule, having been intended as 6.04. It is sometimes jokingly described as their first "Late To Ship" (LTS) release. Development was not complete in April 2006 and Mark Shuttleworth approved slipping the release date to June, making it 6.06 instead.

Ubuntu 6.06's support ended on 14 July 2009 for desktops and ended in June 2011 for servers. Ubuntu 6.06 included several new features, including having the Live CD and Install CD merged onto one disc, a graphical installer on Live CD (Ubiquity), Usplash on shutdown as well as startup, a network manager for easy switching of multiple wired and wireless connections, Humanlooks theme implemented using Tango guidelines, based on Clearlooks and featuring orange colors instead of brown, and GDebi graphical installer for package files. Ubuntu 6.06 did not include a means to install from a USB device, but did for the first time allow installation directly onto removable USB devices.

Ubuntu 6.10 (Edgy Eft) 

Ubuntu 6.10 (Edgy Eft), released on 26 October 2006, was Canonical's fifth release of Ubuntu. Ubuntu 6.10's support ended on 25 April 2008. Ubuntu 6.10 added several new features including a heavily modified Human theme, Upstart init daemon, automated crash reports (Apport), Tomboy note taking application, and F-Spot photo manager. EasyUbuntu, a third party program designed to make Ubuntu easier to use, was included in Ubuntu 6.10 as a meta-package.

Ubuntu 7.04 (Feisty Fawn) 

Ubuntu 7.04 (Feisty Fawn), released on 19 April 2007, was Canonical's sixth release of Ubuntu. Ubuntu 7.04's support ended on 19 October 2008. Ubuntu 7.04 included several new features, among them a migration assistant to help former Microsoft Windows users transition to Ubuntu, support for Kernel-based Virtual Machine, assisted codec and restricted drivers installation including Adobe Flash, Java, MP3 support, easier installation of Nvidia and ATI drivers, Compiz desktop effects, support for Wi-Fi Protected Access, the addition of Sudoku and chess, a disk usage analyzer (baobab), GNOME Control Center, and zeroconf support for many devices.

Ubuntu 7.10 (Gutsy Gibbon) 

Ubuntu 7.10 (Gutsy Gibbon), released on 18 October 2007, was Canonical's seventh release of Ubuntu. Ubuntu 7.10's support ended on 18 April 2009. Ubuntu 7.10 included several new features, among them AppArmor security framework, fast desktop search, a Firefox plug-in manager (Ubufox), a graphical configuration tool for X.Org, full NTFS support (read/write) via NTFS-3G, and a revamped printing system with PDF printing by default. Compiz Fusion was enabled as default in Ubuntu 7.10 and Fast user switching was added.

Ubuntu 8.04 LTS (Hardy Heron) 

Ubuntu 8.04 (Hardy Heron), released on 24 April 2008, was Canonical's eighth release of Ubuntu and the second long-term support release. Ubuntu 8.04's support ended on 12 May 2011 for desktops and ended on 9 May 2013 for servers as well. Ubuntu 8.04 included several new features, among them Tracker desktop search integration, Brasero disk burner, Transmission BitTorrent client, Vinagre VNC client, system sound through PulseAudio, and Active Directory authentication and login using Likewise Open. In addition Ubuntu 8.04 included updates for better Tango compliance, various Compiz usability improvements, automatic grabbing and releasing of the mouse cursor when running on a VMware virtual machine, and an easier method to remove Ubuntu. Ubuntu 8.04 was the first version of Ubuntu to include the Wubi installer on the Live CD that allows Ubuntu to be installed as a single file on a Windows hard drive without the need to repartition the disk. The first version of the Ubuntu Netbook Remix was also introduced.

Ubuntu 8.10 (Intrepid Ibex) 

Ubuntu 8.10 (Intrepid Ibex), released on 30 October 2008, was Canonical's ninth release of Ubuntu. Support ended on 30 April 2010. Ubuntu 8.10 introduced several new features including improvements to mobile computing and desktop scalability, increased flexibility for Internet connectivity, an Ubuntu Live USB creator and a guest account, which allowed others to use a computer allowing very limited user rights (e.g. accessing the Internet, using software and checking e-mail). The guest account had its own home folder and nothing done on it was stored permanently on the computer's hard disk. Intrepid Ibex also included an encrypted private directory for users, the inclusion of Dynamic Kernel Module Support, a tool that allows kernel drivers to be automatically rebuilt when new kernels are released, and support for creating USB flash drive images.

Ubuntu 9.04 (Jaunty Jackalope) 

Ubuntu 9.04 (Jaunty Jackalope), released on 23 April 2009, was Canonical's tenth release of Ubuntu. Support ended on 23 October 2010. New features included faster boot time and integration of web services and applications into the desktop interface. Because of that, they named it after the mythical jackalope. It was the first release named after a mythical animal, the second being Utopic Unicorn. It had a new usplash screen, a new login screen and also support for both Wacom (hotplugging) and netbooks. It also included a new notification system, Notify OSD, and themes. It marked the first time that all of Ubuntu's core development moved to the GNU Bazaar distributed version control system.

Ubuntu 9.04 was the first version to support the ARM architecture with native support for ARMv5EL and ARMv6EL-VFP.

Ubuntu 9.10 (Karmic Koala) 

Ubuntu 9.10 (Karmic Koala), released on 29 October 2009, was Canonical's 11th release of Ubuntu. It was supported until April 2011.

In an announcement to the community on 20 February 2009, Mark Shuttleworth explained that 9.10 would focus on improvements in cloud computing on the server using Eucalyptus, saying "... a Koala's favourite leaf is Eucalyptus", as well as further improvements in boot speed and development of the Netbook Remix.

The initial announcement of version 9.10 indicated that this release might include a new theme, but the project was delayed to version 10.04, and only minor revisions were made to the default theme. Other graphical improvements included a new set of boot up and shutdown splash screens, a new login screen that transitions seamlessly into the desktop and greatly improved performance on Intel graphics chip-sets.

In June 2009, Canonical created the One Hundred Paper Cuts project, focusing developers to fix minor usability issues. A "paper cut" was defined as, "a trivially fixable usability bug that the average user would encounter on his/her first day of using a brand new installation of the latest version of Ubuntu Desktop Edition."

The desktop installation of Ubuntu 9.10 replaced Pidgin with Empathy Instant Messenger as its default instant messaging client. The default filesystem is ext4, and the Ubuntu One client, which interfaces with Canonical's new online storage system, is installed by default. It introduced Grub 2 beta as default bootloader. It also debuted a new application called the Ubuntu Software Center that unifies package management. Canonical stated their intention for this application to replace Add/Remove Programs (gnome-app-install) in 9.10 and possibly Synaptic, Software Sources, Gdebi and Update Manager in Ubuntu 10.04. Karmic Koala also includes a slideshow during the installation process (through ubiquity-slideshow) that highlights applications and features in Ubuntu.

Ubuntu 10.04 LTS (Lucid Lynx) 

Shuttleworth first announced Ubuntu 10.04 (Lucid Lynx) on 19 September 2009 at the Atlanta Linux Fest; Canonical released it on 29 April 2010. It was Canonical's 12th release of Ubuntu and the third long-term  support (LTS) release.

The new release included, among other things, improved support for Nvidia proprietary graphics drivers, while switching to the open source Nvidia graphics driver, Nouveau, by default. Plymouth was also introduced, allowing boot animations. It also included a video editor for the first time, Pitivi.

GIMP was removed from the Lucid installation CD due to its professional-grade complexity and its file size. F-Spot provided normal user-level graphics-editing capabilities and GIMP remained available for download in the repositories.

The distribution emphasized the increasing importance of Web services and of social networking services with integrated interfaces for posting to sites like Facebook and Twitter, complementing the IM and email integration already in Ubuntu.

On 4 March 2010 it was announced that Lucid Lynx would feature a new theme, including new logos, taking Ubuntu's new visual style into account:

The new theme met with mixed critical responses. Ars Technicas Ryan Paul said: "The new themes and updated color palette are nice improvement for Ubuntu ... After testing the new theme for several hours, I feel like it's a step forward, but it still falls a bit short of my expectations." Paul also noted that the most controversial aspect of the new design amongst users was the placement of the window-control buttons on the left instead of on the right side of the windows. TechSource's Jun Auza expressed concern that the new theme was too close to that used by Apple's Mac OS X: "I think Ubuntu is having an identity crisis right now and should seriously consider changing several things in terms of look and feel to avoid being branded as a Mac OS X rip-off, or worse, get sued by Apple." Auza also summarized Ubuntu user feedback: "I believe the fans are divided right now. Some have learned to love the brown color scheme since it uniquely represents Ubuntu, while others wanted change."

The first point release, 10.04.1, was made available on 17 August 2010, and the second update, 10.04.2, was released on 17 February 2011. The third update, 10.04.3, was released on 21 July 2011, and the fourth and final update, 10.04.4, was released on 16 February 2012.

Canonical provided support for the desktop version of Ubuntu 10.04 until 9 May 2013 and for the server version until 30 April 2015.

Ubuntu 10.10 (Maverick Meerkat) 

The naming of Ubuntu 10.10 (Maverick Meerkat) was announced by Mark Shuttleworth on 2 April 2010, along with the release's goals of improving the netbook experience and a server focus on hybrid cloud computing. Ubuntu 10.10 was released on 10 October 2010 (10.10.10) at around 10:10 UTC. This is a departure from the traditional schedule of releasing at the end of October to get "the perfect 10", and a playful reference to The Hitchhiker's Guide to the Galaxy, since, in binary, 101010 is equal to the number 42, the "Answer to the Ultimate Question of Life, the Universe and Everything" within the series. It was Canonical's 13th release of Ubuntu. New features included the new Unity interface for the Netbook Edition, a new default photo manager, Shotwell, replacing F-Spot, the ability to purchase applications in the Software Center, and an official Ubuntu font used by default.

Support for Ubuntu Maverick Meerkat 10.10 was officially ended on 10 April 2012.

Ubuntu 11.04 (Natty Narwhal) 

The naming of Ubuntu 11.04 (Natty Narwhal) was announced on 17 August 2010 by Mark Shuttleworth. Ubuntu 11.04 Natty Narwhal was released on 28 April 2011. It is Canonical's 14th release of Ubuntu.

Ubuntu 11.04 used the Unity user interface instead of GNOME 2 as default. The move to Unity was controversial as some GNOME developers feared it would fracture the community and marginalize GNOME Shell. The GNOME desktop environment is still available in Ubuntu 11.04 under the title Ubuntu Classic as a fallback to Unity.

Ubuntu 11.04 employed Banshee as the default music player, replacing Rhythmbox. Other new applications included Mozilla Firefox 4 and LibreOffice, which replaced OpenOffice.org. The OpenStack cloud computing platform was added in this release.

Starting with Ubuntu 11.04, the Ubuntu Netbook Edition was merged into the desktop edition.

In reviewing Ubuntu 11.04 upon its stable release, Ryan Paul of Ars Technica said "There is a lot to like in Ubuntu 11.04, but also a lot of room for improvement." Jesse Smith of DistroWatch said "I'm of the opinion there are good features in this release, but 11.04 definitely suffered from being rushed out the door while it was still beta quality. Ubuntu aims to be novice-friendly, but this release is buggy and I think they missed the mark this time around. I'm limiting my recommendation of 11.04 to people who want to play with an early release of Unity."

Support for Ubuntu 11.04 officially ended on 28 October 2012.

Ubuntu 11.10 (Oneiric Ocelot) 

The naming of Ubuntu 11.10 (Oneiric Ocelot) was announced on 7 March 2011 by Mark Shuttleworth. He explained that Oneiric means "dreamy". Ubuntu 11.10 was released on schedule on 13 October 2011 and is Canonical's 15th release of Ubuntu.

In April 2011, Shuttleworth announced that Ubuntu 11.10 would not include the classic GNOME desktop as a fall back to Unity, unlike Ubuntu 11.04 Natty Narwhal. Instead, 11.10 included a 2D version of Unity as a fallback for computers that lacked the hardware resources for the Compiz-based 3D version. However, the classic GNOME desktop remained available in Ubuntu 11.10 through a package in the Ubuntu repositories. Shuttleworth also confirmed that Unity in Ubuntu 11.10 would run as a shell for GNOME 3 on top of GNOME 3 libraries, unlike in Ubuntu 11.04 where it ran as a shell for GNOME 2. Moreover, users were able to install the entire GNOME 3 stack along with GNOME Shell directly from the Ubuntu repositories; to be presented with a "GNOME 3 desktop" choice at login. During the development cycle there were many changes to Unity, including the placement of the Ubuntu button on the Launcher instead of on the Panel, the autohiding of the window controls (and the global menu) of maximized windows, the introduction of more transparency into the Dash (and the Panel when the Dash was opened) and the introduction of window controls for the Dash.

In May 2011, it was announced that Pitivi would be no longer part of the Ubuntu ISO, starting with Ubuntu 11.10 Oneiric Ocelot. The reasons given for removing it included poor user reception, lack of fit with the default user-case for Ubuntu, lack of polish and the application's lack of development maturity. PiTiVi will not be replaced on the ISO with another video editor. Other changes include removing Computer Janitor, as it caused broken systems for users, and the removal of the Synaptic package manager, which can optionally be installed via the Ubuntu Software Center. Déjà Dup has been added as Ubuntu's backup program. Mozilla Thunderbird has replaced the GNOME Evolution email client. All removed applications will remain available to users for installation from the Ubuntu Software Center and repositories.

Support for Ubuntu Oneiric Ocelot was officially ended on 9 May 2013.

Ubuntu 12.04 LTS (Precise Pangolin) 

Ubuntu 12.04 LTS (Precise Pangolin) is Canonical's sixteenth release of Ubuntu and its fourth long-term support (LTS) release, made available on schedule on 26 April 2012. It is named after the pangolin anteater. Previous LTS releases have been supported for three years for the desktop version and five years for the server version; this release was supported for five years for both versions, with support ending on 28 April 2017. Canonical continues to offer extended security maintenance to Advantage customers for an additional two years.

Changes in this release include a much faster startup time for the Ubuntu Software Center and refinements to Unity. This release also switched the default media player from Banshee back to Rhythmbox and dropped the Tomboy note-taking application and the supporting Mono framework as well. Also, the window dodge feature has been removed from the Unity launcher starting with Ubuntu 12.04.

Ubuntu 12.04 incorporated a new head-up display (HUD) feature that allows hot key searching for application menu items from the keyboard, without needing the mouse. Shuttleworth said that the HUD "will ultimately replace menus in Unity applications" but for Ubuntu 12.04 at least the menus will remain.

Ubuntu 12.04 is the first Ubuntu release shipped with IPv6 privacy extensions turned on by default. Ubuntu 11.10 already supported IPv6 on the desktop and in the installer (stateless address autoconfiguration SLAAC, stateless DHCPv6 and stateful DHCPv6).

Like previous LTS releases, 12.04 included point releases that bundled updates to shorten downloads for users installing the release later in its life-cycle. The point releases and dates were: 12.04.1 (23 August 2012), 12.04.2 (14 February 2013), 12.04.3 (scheduled for release on 22 August 2013, but actually released on 23 August 2013), 12.04.4 (6 February 2014) and 12.04.5 (7 August 2014).

Jesse Smith of DistroWatch said that many people, like he, had questioned Ubuntu's direction, including Unity, but with Ubuntu 12.04 he felt that the puzzle pieces, which individually may have been underwhelming, had come together to form a whole, clear picture. He said "Unity, though a step away from the traditional desktop, has several features which make it attractive, such as reducing mouse travel. The HUD means that newcomers can find application functionality with a quick search and more advanced users can use the HUD to quickly run menu commands from the keyboard." He wrote that Unity had grown to maturity, while indicating that he was bothered by its lack of flexibility. He did notice issues, however, especially that the HUD did not work in LibreOffice and performance in a virtual machine was unsatisfactory. He concluded that Ubuntu's overall experience was "head and shoulders above anything else in the Linux ecosystem."

Jim Lynch wrote "Ubuntu 12.04 is definitely worth an upgrade if you're running an earlier version. Unity is finally coming into its own in this release, plus there are other enhancements that make upgrading worthwhile. Ubuntu is getting better and better with each release. I was one of the Unity skeptics initially, but I've come to accept it as part of Ubuntu."

Jack Wallen of TechRepublic, who had strongly criticized early versions of Unity, said "Since Ubuntu 12.04 was released, and I migrated over from Linux Mint, I'm working much more efficiently. This isn't really so much a surprise to me, but to many of the detractors who assume Unity a very unproductive desktop ... well, I can officially say they are wrong. [...] I realize that many people out there have spurned Unity (I was one of them for a long time), but the more I use it, the more I realize that Canonical really did their homework on how to help end users more efficiently interact with their computers. Change is hard – period. For many, the idea of change is such a painful notion they wind up missing out on some incredible advancements. Unity is one such advancement."

Ubuntu 12.10 (Quantal Quetzal) 

On 23 April 2012 Shuttleworth announced that Ubuntu 12.10 would be named Quantal Quetzal. As this will be the first of a series of three releases before the next LTS release, Shuttleworth indicated that it will include a refreshed look, with work to be done on typography and iconography. The release takes its name from the quetzal, a species of Central American birds. Ubuntu 12.10 was released on schedule on 18 October 2012 and is Canonical's seventeenth release of the operating system.

Ryan Paul, writing for Ars Technica, said in April 2012 when the name was announced "A Quetzal is a colorful bird that is common to Central America. The most well-known variety, the resplendent quetzal, is known for its beauty. The name is a good fit for Ubuntu, which aims to soar in the cloud, offer visual appeal without compromising function, and avoid smacking into closed windows."

The Ubuntu Developer Summit held in May 2012 set the priorities for this release. They are forecast to include an improved boot up sequence and log-in screen, dropping Unity 2D in favor of lower hardware requirements for Unity 3D, wrap around dialogs and toolbars for the head-up display and a "vanilla" version of Gnome-Shell as an option. The release would likely include GNOME 3.6, Python 3 and the 3.5 Linux kernel. It would ship with Python 3 in the image, but with Python 2 available in the repositories, via the "Python" package. The kernel will have the PAE switched on by default.

In July 2012, development versions of Ubuntu 12.10 received a new combined user, session and system menu. This release also included Ubuntu Web Apps, a means of running Web applications directly from the desktop, without having to open a browser. It would use Nautilus 3.4 as its file manager, in place of the 3.5 and newer versions, to retain features deleted from later versions.

In September 2012, Canonical's Kate Stewart announced that the Ubuntu 12.10 image would not fit on a compact disc, saying "There is no longer a traditional CD sized image, DVD or alternate image, but rather a single 800MB Ubuntu image that can be used from USB or DVD." However, a third-party project has created a version of Ubuntu 12.10 that fits on a CD. It uses LZMA2 compression instead of the DEFLATE compression used on the official Ubuntu DVD image.

Also in late September 2012, it was announced that the version of Unity to be shipped with Ubuntu 12.10 would by default include searches of Amazon.com for searched terms. This move caused immediate controversy among Ubuntu users, particularly with regard to privacy issues, and caused Mark Shuttleworth to issue a statement indicating that this feature is not adware and labelled many of the objections "FUD" (Fear, uncertainty, and doubt). Shuttleworth stated "What we have in 12.10 isn't the full experience, so those who leap to judgement are at maximum risk of having to eat their words later. Chill out. If the first cut doesn't work for you, remove it, or just search the specific scope you want (there are hotkeys for all the local scopes)." Regardless, users filed a Launchpad bug report on the feature requesting that it be made a separate lens and not included with general desktop searches for files, directories and applications. The degree of community push-back on the issue resulted in plans by the developers to make the dash and where it searches user-configurable via a GUI-setting dialogue. Despite concerns that the setting dialogue would not make the final version of Ubuntu 12.10, it was completed and is present in the final version of 12.10.

In the week prior to the stable release of Ubuntu 12.10 data-privacy advocate Luís de Sousa indicated that the inclusion of the shopping lens, installed without explicit permission of the user, violates European Directive 95/46/EC on data privacy. That directive requires that the "data subject has unambiguously given his consent" in situations where personal identifying information is sent.

In reviewing Ubuntu 12.10 at the end of October 2012 for DistroWatch, Jesse Smith raised concerns about the Amazon shopping lens, saying, "it has raised a number of privacy concerns in the community and, looking over Ubuntu's legal notice about privacy does not provide any reassurance. The notice informs us Canonical reserves the right to share our keystrokes, search terms and IP address with a number of third parties, including Facebook, Twitter, Amazon and the BBC. This feature is enabled by default, but can be turned off through the distribution's settings panel." He also found that the dash provided very slow performance and that the release was "practically unusable in the VirtualBox environment". He summed up his experiences, "After a day and a half of using Ubuntu 12.10 it was an internal struggle not to wipe my hard drive and just find another distribution to review. During the first twenty-four hours Ubuntu spied on me, provided performance which was distinctly sub par, the interface regularly popped up errors (sometimes so frequently the first pop-up wouldn't have faded out of view before the next one appeared), the update notification didn't work and it wasn't possible to turn off accessibility features through the graphical interface. Adding insult to injury, the Unity dash kept locking up or losing focus while I was trying to use it and the operating system crashed more times than not while trying to shutdown or logout. Switching away from Unity to GNOME Fallback helped the performance issues I had experienced with the Dash, but it didn't remove the annoying pop-up errors and performance (while usable) still wasn't as good as I would expect. And what really makes me scratch my head is Ubuntu 12.04 worked really well on this same hardware."

In early November, the Electronic Frontier Foundation made a statement on the shopping lens issue, "Technically, when you search for something in Dash, your computer makes a secure HTTPS connection to productsearch.ubuntu.com, sending along your search query and your IP address. If it returns Amazon products to display, your computer then insecurely loads the product images from Amazon's server over HTTP. This means that a passive eavesdropper, such as someone sharing a wireless network with you, will be able to get a good idea of what you're searching for on your own computer based on Amazon product images. It's a major privacy problem if you can't find things on your own computer without broadcasting what you're looking for to the world."

Writing about Ubuntu 12.10 in a December 2012 review, Jim Lynch addressed the Amazon controversy:

He concluded by saying, "Overall, Ubuntu 12.10 is a decent upgrade for current Ubuntu users. However, the inclusion of the Amazon icon on the launcher, and the discontinuation of Unity 2D might irritate some people."

Support for Ubuntu 12.10 Quantal Quetzal officially ended on 16 May 2014.

Ubuntu 13.04 (Raring Ringtail) 

On 17 October 2012, Shuttleworth announced that Ubuntu 13.04 would be named Raring Ringtail and said about this release "[In the next six months] we want to have the phone, tablet and TV all lined up. So I think it's time to look at the core of Ubuntu and review it through a mobile lens: let's measure our core platform by mobile metrics, things like battery life, number of running processes, memory footprint, and polish the rough edges that we find when we do that."

The Wubi installer was dropped as of 13.04, due to its incompatibility with Windows 8 and general lack of support and development. Previously, on 29 October 2012 at the Ubuntu Developer Summit registration, there had been a discussion of redesigning Wubi for Ubuntu 13.04.

Ubuntu 13.04 was released on schedule on 25 April 2013.

In reviewing Ubuntu 13.04 Jim Lynch from Desktop Linux Reviews said, "I found Ubuntu 13.04 to be a slightly disappointing upgrade. While there are definitely some enhancements in this release, there's also nothing very special about it ... Alas, there's nothing in Ubuntu 13.04 that makes me want to consider it for use as my daily distro. Don't misunderstand me, there's nothing overtly wrong with Ubuntu 13.04 either. It installed and performed very well for me. Unity 7 also has some helpful and attractive updates that Ubuntu users will enjoy, and there are other things in this release that help improve the overall Ubuntu experience ... I suspect it is simply because Ubuntu has settled into a comfortable middle age, it works and it works very well for what it does."

Support for Ubuntu 13.04 officially ended on 27 January 2014.

Ubuntu 13.10 (Saucy Salamander) 

Ubuntu 13.10 is named Saucy Salamander. It was released on schedule on 17 October 2013.

Consideration was given to changing the default browser from Mozilla Firefox to Chromium, but problems with timely updates to Ubuntu's Chromium package caused developers to retain Firefox for this release.

Ubuntu 13.10 was intended to be the first Ubuntu release to replace the aging X Window System (X11) with the Mir display server, with X11 programs to have operated through the XMir compatibility layer. However, after the development of XMir ran into "outstanding technical difficulties" for multiple monitors, Canonical decided to postpone the default use of Mir in Ubuntu. Mir will still be released as the default display server for Ubuntu Touch 13.10.

Ryan Paul of Ars Technica wrote that although 13.10 brings useful enhancements, it is "a relatively thin update". He also said "the new Dash concept is intriguing, but its usefulness is a bit limited"; and even though he thinks that universal Web search is potentially useful, he's somewhat uncomfortable with how Canonical joins it with local system searches.

In a review of Ubuntu 13.10 Joey Sneddon of OMG Ubuntu criticized the new Smart Scopes feature, saying, "it's less of a help and more of a hindrance. With so many web services offering results for a search term – however innocuous it might be – the Dash ends up resembling a wall painted in unintelligible, irrelevant mess." Sneddon noted that internet search engines turn in more useful and better organized results and recommended selectively disabling individual scopes to reduce the noise factor.

Jim Lynch of Linux Desktop Reviews described the release as "boring" and noted, "alas, Ubuntu 13.10 follows in the footsteps of Ubuntu 13.04. The big new desktop feature is Smart Scopes ... Beyond that there's not a whole lot that is interesting or exciting to talk about. It turns out that Saucy Salamander is one truly dull amphibian. Canonical really should rename this release to 'Snoozing Salamander' instead." Lynch described the Smart Scopes, "this is a very useful function, and it can save you a lot of time when looking for information. I understand that some people will regard this as a privacy violation, no problem. There's an easy way to disable Smart Scopes."

Maria Korolov writing for Network World in December 2013 said of the release, "there is a benefit to be had in being able to search for files you own on both local drives and in cloud services such as Google Drive and Flickr. That's the idea behind Unity Smart Scopes ... The result is a cluttered mess. The first thing many users will probably do after installing Ubuntu 13.10 is to get rid of most of these results ... mixing generic Web results in with your own files is just confusing."

In its year-end Readers Choice Awards, Linux Journal readers voted Ubuntu as Best Linux Distribution and Best Desktop Distribution for 2013.

Support for Ubuntu 13.10 ended on 17 July 2014.

Ubuntu 14.04 LTS (Trusty Tahr) 

Mark Shuttleworth announced on 31 October 2011 that by Ubuntu 14.04, Ubuntu would support smartphones, tablets, TVs and smart screens.

On 18 October 2013, it was announced that Ubuntu 14.04 would be dubbed "Trusty Tahr".

This version was released on 17 April 2014, and is the 20th release of Ubuntu. Shuttleworth indicated that the focus in this development cycle would be a release characterized by "performance, refinement, maintainability, technical debt" and encouraged the developers to make "conservative choices". Technical debt refers to catching up and refining supporting work for earlier changes. The development cycle for this release focused on the tablet interface, specifically for the Nexus 7 and Nexus 10 tablets. There were few changes to the desktop, as 14.04 used the existing mature Unity 7 interface. Ubuntu 14.04 included the ability to turn off the global menu system and used locally integrated menus instead for individual applications. Other features were the retention of Xorg and not Mir or XMir, a Unity 8 developers' preview, new mobile applications, a redesigned USB Startup Disk Creator tool, a new forked version of the GNOME Control Center, called the Unity Control Center and default SSD TRIM support. GNOME 3.10 is installed by default.

Point releases included 14.04.1 on 24 July 2014, 14.04.2 on 19 February 2015, 14.04.3 on 6 August 2015, 14.04.4 on 18 February 2016, 14.04.5 on 4 August 2016 and 14.04.6 on 7 March 2019. The release initially included Linux kernel 3.13, but this was updated to 4.2 with the point release of 14.04.4 on 18 February 2016. Point release 14.04.5, which provided the latest Linux kernel and graphics stacks from Ubuntu 16.04 LTS, was intended to be the final point release for 14.04 LTS, but 14.04.6 was released on 7 March 2019 as a security-targeted update.

Joey Sneddon of OMG Ubuntu noted that recent Ubuntu releases have received lower and lower amounts of mainstream press coverage and termed it an "established product that has, by and large, remained a niche interest".

In reviewing Ubuntu 14.04 LTS in April 2014, Jim Lynch concluded: "Ubuntu 14.04 seems to be all about refining the Ubuntu desktop. While there are not a lot of amazing new features in this release, there are quite a few very useful and needed tweaks that add up to a much better desktop experience. Canonical's designers seem to be listening to Ubuntu users again, and they seem willing to make the changes necessary to give the users what they want. That may be the single most important thing about Ubuntu 14.04. It could be an indication of a sea change in Canonical's attitude toward Ubuntu users."

Jack Wallin writing for TechRepublic termed Ubuntu 14.04 LTS, "as polished a distribution as you'll find. It's cleaner, performs better, and is all around improved. Some users may say that this is the most boring release Canonical has unleashed in years, but I believe it to be one of the finest."

Terry Relph-Knight of ZDNet said, "although there are no amazing 'must-have' new features in Ubuntu 14.04, it is worth upgrading just to get the latest LTS release with a more recent kernel and default applications."

Scott Gilbertson of Ars Technica stated, "Ubuntu is one of the most polished desktops around, certainly the most polished in the Linux world, but in many ways that polish is increasingly skin deep at the expense of some larger usability issues, which continue to go unaddressed release after release."

Normal LTS support continued until 25 April 2019, after which extended security maintenance is available to Ubuntu Advantage customers and as a separate commercial purchase, as was the case previously with 12.04. In September, 2021, Canonical announced that it would extend LTS support for the 14.04 and 16.04 to a total of 10 years, extending the ESM support date for 14.04 until April 2024.

Ubuntu 14.10 (Utopic Unicorn) 

On 23 April 2014 Shuttleworth announced that Ubuntu 14.10 would carry the name Utopic Unicorn. Version 14.10 was released on 23 October, having only minor updates to the kernel, Unity Desktop, and included packages such as LibreOffice and Mozilla Firefox and Thunderbird. The kernel was updated to 3.16 for hardware support (e.g. graphics) and has for security, full kernel address space layout randomization applied to the kernel and its modules, plus the closure of a number of information leaks in /proc.

This version is the 21st release. Ubuntu 14.10 was officially characterized as a release that addressed "bug fixes and incremental quality improvements" and so it incorporated very few new features.

Joey Sneddon of OMG Ubuntu wrote in reviewing this release, "Ubuntu 14.10, codenamed "Utopic Unicorn", is saddled with a modest changelog, composed largely of bug fixes, stability improvements and key software updates. All worthy, but falls a little way short of the "fresh ideas and new art" that should "raise the roof" – quotes from Mark Shuttleworth's "U" name announcement ... For the release taking place in the week of Ubuntu's 10th anniversary, this may all read like a bit of an anticlimax. No headline user features, no visual changes (bar a few new icons for the sidebar of Nautilus) – there's not even a new default wallpaper to look at...But on the flip side it's perhaps the most fitting release; the one that shows just how far Ubuntu has come in the past few years. Mature, dependable and sure in its own (Ambiance-themed) skin, buggy feature churn has given way to a sustained era of assured stability ... Ubuntu 14.10 is a rock-solid, hearty and dependable release. Perhaps more here than ever before. There's no getting away from the fact that it's an uninspiring update on paper, and is far from being anything approaching essential."

Michael Larabel of Phoronix wrote, "At the end of the day simple end-users won't see much of a difference over Ubuntu 14.04 LTS, which is a bit sad given that this is the tenth anniversary release of Ubuntu Linux. For everyday Linux desktop users the many upgraded packages are great but there isn't too much more to celebrate about today on the desktop front."

Scott Gilbertson, writing for The Register, explained, "I've been covering Ubuntu for seven of the release's 10 years and 14.10 is the first time I've had to dig deep into the release notes just to find something new to test ... If you needed further proof that Canonical is currently solely focused on bringing its Unity 8 interface to mobile devices, 14.10 is the best evidence yet ... Almost nothing Canonical develops has changed in this release – there isn't even a new desktop wallpaper. There are some updates to be sure, but they don't hail from Canonical ... The lack of updates isn't unexpected, in fact that's been the plan all along ... Desktop Ubuntu is currently in a kind of suspended animation, waiting on Unity 8 and Mir to be ready for its coming metamorphosis. The short story is that it makes no sense for Canonical to keep refining Unity 7 when it will soon be retired."

Ubuntu 15.04 (Vivid Vervet) 

On 20 October 2014 Shuttleworth announced that Ubuntu 15.04 would be named Vivid Vervet. It was released on 23 April 2015. This was the 22nd Ubuntu release.

Ubuntu 15.04 used systemd instead of Upstart by default. This release also featured locally integrated menus by default, replacing the previous default global menus.

Silviu Stahie, writing for Softpedia, said about this release while it was in beta, "Ubuntu 15.04 is not an exciting release, but that it's only a surface impression. The truth is that it's an important upgrade, because some very important changes have been made, including the adoption of systemd. Users will notice that not too many visual changes have been implemented in Ubuntu 15.04, but that was to be expected. The team is transitioning to a new Unity version that is still not ready for general use, so it's easy to understand why Ubuntu 15.04 is not all that different from Ubuntu 14.10."

This release included modest improvements in Intel Haswell graphics performance and bigger improvements for AMD Radeon graphics cards using the open-source Radeon R600 and RadeonSI Gallium3D drivers.

In reviewing this release, Joey Sneddon, of OMG Ubuntu, said "Ubuntu 15.04 is yet another solid entry in the distribution's long release history. A dependable desktop operating system suited for end users but with plenty of convenient extras to woo developers with. Though the Unity 7 desktop is largely mothballed as work progresses on the new converged experience with Unity 8, the modest refinements received here buff the experience. Unity in Ubuntu 15.04 shines brighter, a glowing example of a desktop that 'just works' for users.".

Jesse Smith of DistroWatch wrote, "One of the changes I was interested in exploring was Ubuntu's switch from the Upstart init software to systemd. In this regard I was pleasantly surprised. I find most distributions, when they initially make the switch to systemd, introduce bugs or, at the very least, break backward compatibility. Sometimes service managers stop working properly and network device names usually change. Even if everything works as it should, the administrator needs to adjust to systemd's approach to logging and adopt a different method of managing services. Ubuntu has taken an approach I like with regards to adopting systemd." He concluded, "on the surface, Ubuntu 15.04 does not bring many changes. There are a few cosmetic adjustments, but nothing major that desktop users are likely to notice. Most of the interesting work appears to be going on behind the scenes ... Ubuntu 15.04 feels very stable and easy to configure. This is an operating system that is virtually effortless to set up and run and I feel the Unity 7 desktop does a nice job of providing lots of features while staying out of the way ... All in all, I like what Canonical has done with Ubuntu 15.04. This feels like a small, incremental evolution for Ubuntu and Unity. The init switch, which has disrupted the users of several other distributions, goes largely unnoticed in Ubuntu and I think that is worthy of praise."

Ubuntu 15.10 (Wily Werewolf) 

Shuttleworth announced on 4 May 2015 that Ubuntu 15.10 would be called Wily Werewolf. He initially expressed hope that the release would include the Mir display server, but it was released on 22 October 2015 without Mir. It was the 23rd release of Ubuntu.

Ubuntu 15.10 eliminated the disappearing window edge scrollbars in favour of the upstream GNOME scrollbars, a move designed to save developer time in creating patches and updates.

In reviewing the release, Chris Jones wrote, "Ubuntu 15.10 as an operating system for Review is pretty lackluster. There's nothing new as such and there's nothing we can really say that is going to change your opinion from its predecessor, 15.04. Therefore, we recommend you to upgrade either out of habit and according to your regular upgrade schedule rather than out of a specific necessity for a specific feature of this release. Because there is really nothing that could possibly differentiate it from the older, yet still very stable 15.04 release. But if you're going to stick with 15.04 for a little longer, we do recommend that you look at upgrading the kernel to the latest 4.2 branch. It is worth it. If you really want a reason to upgrade? Linux kernel 4.2 would be our sole reason for taking Ubuntu 15.10 into consideration."

Joey Sneddon of OMG Ubuntu noted, "For a release named after a terrifying mythological creature Ubuntu 15.10 is surprisingly tame. There are no dramatic transformations, no bone popping or shirt ripping and certainly no hair sprouting under the milky eye of full moon. In fact, a new wallpaper and change in scrollbar appearance is about as shapeshift-y as this werewolf gets."

Steven J. Vaughan-Nichols of ZDNet praised the release for its integration of cloud services, such as the new Ubuntu OpenStack cloud deployment and management tool, OpenStack Autopilot as well as its server tools. Ubuntu's machine container hypervisor, LXD, included by default in 15.10, was singled out. Vaughan-Nichols concluded, "with these advances, chances are you're more likely to use Ubuntu, hidden behind the scenes, on clouds and servers."

A Hectic Geek review noted problems with X.Org Server crashes and concluded "If you use Ubuntu 14.04 LTS and if it's working out for you, then there really is no need to switch to a non-LTS release, especially to the 15.10."

A review on Dedoimedo identified problems with Samba, Bluetooth, desktop searching, battery life and the smartphone interface and found the release inconsistent, saying, "unpredictability is horrible. Give me a good experience, or give me a bad experience, but please try not to seesaw between them erratically. Continuous, steady change in behavior, any which way." The review concluded, "it underperforms compared to some of its siblings and ancestors. Not the best, definitely not worth a perma upgrade, but you might find it more palatable to your hardware and use cases. Overall, though Wily isn't the best of distros. It sure gave me the willies. 7/10."

Ubuntu 16.04 LTS (Xenial Xerus) 

Shuttleworth announced on 21 October 2015 that Ubuntu 16.04 LTS would be called Xenial Xerus. It was released on 21 April 2016.

The default desktop environment continues to be Unity 7, with an option for Unity 8. In May 2015, Shuttleworth indicated that Ubuntu 16.04 LTS would include Unity 8 and Mir, but that users have a choice of that or Unity 7 and X.org. He said, "Unity 8 will be an option for 16.04 and we'll let the community decide the default for 16.04."

The release adds support for Ceph and ZFS filesystems, the LXD hypervisor (using seccomp) for OpenStack, and Snap packages will be supported. It will use systemd instead of Upstart as its init system. This release will replace the Ubuntu Software Center with GNOME Software and eliminate Empathy and Brasero from the ISO file. Reviewer Jack Wallen said, "The truth of the matter is, the Ubuntu Software Center has been a horrible tool for a very long time. Making this move will greatly improve the Ubuntu experience for every user."

This release has online Dash search results disabled by default in Unity 7. "None of your search terms will leave your computer", stated Ubuntu desktop manager Will Cooke. Reviewer Jack Wallen said about this, "I've never considered the inclusion of online search results to be spyware. In fact, I have always considered the online results to be an efficient means of searching for products through Amazon (etc.). That being said, with the release of 16.04, this feature is disabled."

Ubuntu 16.04 LTS does not support the AMD Catalyst (fglrx) driver for AMD/ATI graphics cards and instead recommends the radeon and AMDGPU alternatives. These may not provide optimal graphics performance, however. AMDGPU-PRO is available for Ubuntu 16.04

The first point release, 16.04.1, was released on 21 July 2016. Release of Ubuntu 16.04.2 was delayed a number of times, but it was eventually released on 17 February 2017. Ubuntu 16.04.3 was released on 3 August 2017. Ubuntu 16.04.4 was delayed from 15 February 2018 and released on 1 March 2018, providing the latest Linux kernel, 4.13, from Ubuntu 17.10. Ubuntu 16.04.5 was released on 2 August 2018, and Ubuntu 16.04.6 was released on 28 February 2019. Ubuntu 16.04.7 was released on 13 August 2020.

In September, 2021, Canonical announced that it would extend LTS support for the 14.04 and 16.04 to a total of 10 years, extending the ESM support date for 16.04 until April 2026.

Ubuntu 16.10 (Yakkety Yak) 

Mark Shuttleworth announced on 21 April 2016 that Ubuntu 16.10 would be called Yakkety Yak. It was released on 13 October 2016.

This release features a maintenance version of Unity 7, but offers Unity 8 packages included in the ISO, so that users can test them. Other improvements include a new version of Ubuntu Software that supports faster loading, better support for installing command-line-only non-GUI applications, support for installing fonts and multimedia codecs and introduction of paid applications. It is based on Linux kernel version 4.8.

This version of Ubuntu introduced only minor incremental changes. These included LibreOffice 5.2, GTK3 version by default, the Update Manager shows changelog entries for Personal Package Archives (PPAs), as well as repository software, GNOME applications updated to version 3.20, with some using version 3.22. Also, systemd now handles user sessions as well as the previously implemented system sessions.

Joey Sneddon of OMG Ubuntu said, "Ubuntu 16.10 is not a big update over Ubuntu 16.04 LTS, released back in April. If you were hoping it'd be a compelling or must-have upgrade you'll be sadly disappointed." He did find some improvements, "The Ubuntu Software app is also significantly faster in use. This solves a real pet peeve of mine on the incumbent LTS desktop. Thankfully, Yakkety makes it quicker to find, browser, search and install applications," but concluded, "Ubuntu 16.10 is not a must-have upgrade—not for most people."

Marius Nestor of Softpedia noted, "Ubuntu 16.10 is not an exciting release for fans of the open source operating system. Probably the most important feature of Yakkety Yak is Linux kernel 4.8, which brings support for the latest hardware, but other than that, you'll get some updated components that are mostly based on the old GNOME 3.20 Stack."

Writing in Makeuseof, Bertel King, Jr. said, "If you're feeling underwhelmed, you probably remember the Ubuntu of yesteryear. Back in the days of 8.10, 9.04, and 10.04 each release brought forth a new theme or ambitious feature. Unity first appeared in 10.10 as a netbook interface before replacing the regular desktop in 11.04. By comparison, modern Ubuntu updates feel relatively stagnant. You would be forgiven for not being able to distinguish between 12.04 and 16.10."

Ubuntu 17.04 (Zesty Zapus) 

On 17 October 2016, Mark Shuttleworth announced that the codename of Ubuntu 17.04, released on 13 April 2017, would be Zesty Zapus.

This release dropped support for the 32-bit PowerPC architecture, following the same move by the upstream Debian project. Other changes include the default DNS resolver now being systemd-resolved, Linux kernel 4.10, and support for printers, which allow printing without printer-specific drivers.

Joey Sneddon of OMG Ubuntu said of this release, "this is no normal release of Ubuntu. It's potentially the last version of the distribution that will come with the Unity 7 desktop by default. That's not a certainty, of course, but we know that Ubuntu will switch to GNOME for Ubuntu 18.04 LTS next year. It's reasonable to expect developers to want to kick a few tyres on that switch ahead of time, in the next interim release. A bittersweet release then, Ubuntu 17.04 sees the distro reach the end of the alphabet in codenames, and the end of an era in everything else. Sadly there's not an awful lot to say. Unity is, by and large, the same as it is in the 16.04 LTS ... Ubuntu 17.04 is an iterative update with modest appeal. While there is little compelling reason for anyone running Ubuntu 16.04 LTS to upgrade (especially for those who opt receive the newer hardware enablement stack) it's not an irrelevant release. Ubuntu 16.10 users will want to upgrade to Ubuntu 17.04 for the general around improvements, access to newer apps, and because the truncated support period of these short term releases necessitates it."

Maruis Nestor of Softpedia called it, "a powerful release, both inside and outside" and noted, "the default desktop environment remains Unity 7, so your beloved Ubuntu desktop environment is not going anyway at the moment. It will also be available in the upcoming Ubuntu 17.10 release, whose development will start next month. After that, starting with Ubuntu 18.04 LTS, the GNOME desktop will be used by default."

Ubuntu 17.10 (Artful Aardvark) 

The name of this release, Artful Aardvark, was announced via Launchpad on 21 April 2017, instead of on Shuttleworth's blog as had been the case in the past. It was released on 19 October 2017.

This was the first release of Ubuntu to use the GNOME Shell interface, and replaced X11 with the Wayland display server. In May 2017, Ken VanDine, a Canonical Software Engineer on the Ubuntu desktop team tasked with the switch to GNOME, confirmed that the intention is to ship the most current version of GNOME, with very few changes from a stock installation.

This release also dropped support for 32-bit desktop images but a 32-bit system can still be installed from the minimal ISO.

Writer J.A. Watson of ZDNet said, "I have not been much of an Ubuntu fan for a long time now, but this release includes a lot of significant changes, many of which might address some of my most serious objections about Ubuntu. So I think I should take a closer look at it than I normally do." He noted on printer configuration, "I got a notice that our wireless printer had been successfully configured. I hadn't even thought about trying to set up a printer yet, so that was a very nice surprise – and a good thing to point out to those who are still going around spouting 5+ years out of date information about how difficult it is to use printers with Linux."

Reviewer Scott Gilbertson of Ars Technica wrote, "Ubuntu 17.10 is a huge departure for Ubuntu, but one that sees the distro seemingly getting its footing back. The transition to GNOME, while not without its pitfalls for some users, is surprisingly smooth. Unity did have some features you won't find in GNOME, but Canonical has done a good job of making things familiar, if not identical. More important than individual features in 17.10, this release sees Ubuntu starting over to some degree. The long development process of Unity 8 was threatening to turn it into Godot, but now Ubuntu is free of Unity 8. Its users no longer have to wait for anything."

The first point release, 17.10.1, was released on 12 January 2018. It fixed a problem that prevented the firmware of some Lenovo computers from booting.

Ubuntu 18.04 LTS (Bionic Beaver) 

Ubuntu 18.04 LTS Bionic Beaver is a long-term support version that was released on 26 April 2018, Ubuntu 18.04.1 LTS was released three months later on 26 July 2018. Ubuntu 18.04.2 LTS was released six months after Ubuntu 18.04.1 LTS, on 15 February 2019. Further incremental update releases of the 18.04 LTS cycle were released as 18.04.3 and 18.04.4 at an approximately six-month release cycle, on August 8, 2019, and February 12, 2020, respectively. Version 18.04.5 was released six months later, on 13 August 2020. Ubuntu 18.04.6 LTS was released thirteen months later, on 17 September 2021.

Plans to include a new theme, created by the Ubuntu community, were announced on 5 February 2018. However, as the development of the theme was unfinished and buggy as of 13 March 2018, Ubuntu 18.04 LTS did not include a new theme, and instead retained the Ambiance theme from 2010 as its default theme. The new theme was available as a Snap package.

Ubuntu 18.04 LTS introduced new features, such as colour emoticons, a new To-Do application preinstalled in the default installation, and added the option of a "Minimal Install" to the Ubuntu 18.04 LTS installer, which only installs a web browser and system tools. Ubuntu 18.04 LTS's default display server was returned to Xorg for more stability and reliability, however, Wayland was still included as part of the default install.

This release employed Linux kernel version 4.15, which incorporated a CPU controller for the cgroup v2 interface, AMD secure memory encryption support and improved SATA Link Power Management

For the first time some applications were delivered by default as snaps.

In reviewing Ubuntu 18.04 LTS, Michael Larabel of Phoronix wrote, "Ubuntu 18.04 is mostly an incremental upgrade over Ubuntu 17.10 with updated packages, the switch back to X.Org session by default rather than Wayland, continued presence of Snaps, and a variety of minor user-interface updates. It's really not a big deal going from 17.10 to 18.04 besides the LTS extended support nature, but it is quite a change if upgrading from Ubuntu 16.04 LTS. For that upgrade you now have the GCC 7 compiler, Unity 7 to GNOME Shell by default, and a wealth of other package updates."

In reviewing the Ubuntu 18.04 LTS server version, Michael Larabel of Phoronix indicated that the newly developed text-based installer is an improvement over previous installers.

Ubuntu 18.04 LTS has normal LTS support for five years, until April 2023 and has paid ESM support available from Canonical for an additional five years, until April 2028.

Ubuntu 18.10 (Cosmic Cuttlefish) 

On 8 May 2018, Mark Shuttleworth announced that the codename of Ubuntu 18.10, which was released on 18 October 2018, would be Cosmic Cuttlefish.

The Ubuntu 18.10 installation includes a new theme, named Yaru and the new icon theme, Suru.

Installation speeds are faster due to a lossless compression algorithm known as Zstandard. Startup speeds of pre-installed Snap applications were also improved.

In a review of 18.10 Joey Sneddon of OMG Ubuntu wrote, "Ubuntu 18.10 'Cosmic Cuttlefish' is a modest update compared to 18.04. The vast majority of notable improvements are tucked away out of sight, 'under the hood' ...  Upstream GNOME Shell developers spent the past six months trying to lower GNOME Shell's memory usage and improve the overall performance of the shell, its animations, display manager, and parts of the GNOME extension framework (specifically Gjs), as we touched on in our recap of the new features in GNOME 3.30. Invisible and abstract though these changes are, they're appreciable. So much so that, if I had to describe this release in just one word it'd be 'peppy'. That's testament to the power of collaboration; with upstream devs and Canonical's engineering team working together."

Michael Larabel of Phoronix wrote, "Overall, Ubuntu 18.10 "Cosmic Cuttlefish" is quite a modest six-month upgrade for being the first past the Ubuntu 18.04 cycle. Exciting me the most, of course, is simply the package upgrades with riding Linux 4.18 + Mesa 18.2 for a much better Linux gaming experience and having moved on now to GCC8 ... What didn't get achieved for the Ubuntu 18.10 cycle is the long-awaited data viewer to the Ubuntu software/hardware survey introduced in 18.04 LTS ... As of writing there's still no public means of being able to view the statistics on these opt-in Ubuntu survey installations. Additionally, the plans for better Android phone integration with the Ubuntu 18.10 desktop by means of bundling GS Connect also didn't happen as planned for the Ubuntu 18.10 cycle."

Ubuntu 19.04 (Disco Dingo) 

Ubuntu 19.04, codenamed Disco Dingo, was released on 18 April 2019. It incorporates the Linux kernel version 5.0, which adds support for AMD FreeSync technology for liquid-crystal displays, Raspberry Pi touchscreens, Adiantum encryption, Btrfs swap files as well as many USB 3.2 and Type-C improvements and several new hardware.

Ubuntu 19.04 uses GNOME Shell Desktop 3.32, which includes a new icon set, increased performance, smoother animations, night-light intensity control and advanced application permissions. The updated Nautilus 3.32 file manager now supports favoriting files. A new header bar, as well as 'find' and 'read only' modes have been added to the default terminal emulator. Version 19 of the open-source graphics drivers Mesa is also natively available in this version of Ubuntu. Furthermore, the Grub menu now allows a 'safe graphics' mode, in case of issues with graphics cards or graphics drivers. This option will boot Ubuntu with "NOMODESET" turned on and will allow the installation any proprietary drivers needed by the system. Geoclue integration and fractional scaling in the GNOME Shell for HiDPI displays (currently available only in Wayland sessions and experimentally in Xorg sessions) are also included.

Improvements for running Ubuntu on a VMWare virtual machine include integration of open-vm-tools within Ubuntu, allowing for bi-directional clipboard and file sharing.

Ubuntu Server 19.04 updated QEMU to version 3.1, allowing for creation of a virtual 3D GPU inside QEMU virtual machines. libvirt was updated to version 5.0 and Samba was updated to version 4.10.x. Samba and its dependencies were updated to Python 3, with the exception of tdb, which still builds a Python 2 package, namely python-tdb. Ubuntu Server 19.04 includes the latest OpenStack release, Stein, and has vSwitch version 2.11.

Ubuntu 19.10 (Eoan Ermine) 

Ubuntu 19.10, codenamed "Eoan Ermine", was released on 17 October 2019. Based on the Linux kernel 5.3 which, among others, introduces compatibility for third-generation Ryzen CPU motherboards and associated Intel Wireless devices as well as AMD's 7 nm Navi GPUs, this release improves on loading speeds and adds several new features.
Experimental support for the ZFS filesystem is now available from the installer and can be chosen besides the ext4 filesytem. NVIDIA-specific improvements were made. Proprietary NVIDIA graphics drivers are embedded within the Ubuntu ISO image and therefore are available for direct installation from the installer without the need to be downloaded, in place of the open-source Nouveau drivers. Support for the Raspberry Pi 4 platform was added. The installation media now uses LZ4 compression which, compared to the previously used compression algorithm, gzip, offers faster installation times. This was decided following benchmarking of a variety of compression algorithms conducted by the Ubuntu kernel team. Kernel load and decompression times were tested and LZ4 was found to offer decompression as much as seven times faster. Ubuntu 19.10 uses GNOME 3.34 which, among others, adds the ability to group application icons into folders, introduces a background settings panel and a separate Night Light tab as well as improves upon performance and smoothness. A new Yaru light theme was introduced with this release as well.

In a November 2019, Ars Technica review by Scott Gilbertson, he concluded, "Ubuntu 19.10 is unusual for an October Ubuntu release in that I would call it a must-have upgrade. While it retains some of the experimental elements Ubuntu's fall releases have always been known for, the speed boosts to GNOME alone make this release well worth your time ... Ubuntu 19.10 is quite possibly the best release of Ubuntu Canonical has ever delivered. It's well worth upgrading if you're already an Ubuntu user, and it's well worth trying even if you're not."

Ubuntu 20.04 LTS (Focal Fossa) 

Ubuntu 20.04 LTS, codenamed Focal Fossa, is a long-term support release and was released on 23 April 2020. Ubuntu 20.04.1 LTS was released on 6 August 2020.

As an LTS release, it will provide maintenance updates for 5 years, until April 2025. This release is based on the long-term supported Linux kernel 5.4 which adds support for new hardware, including Intel Comet Lake CPUs and initial Tiger Lake platforms, Qualcomm's Snapdragon 835 and 855 SoCs as well as AMD Navi 12 and 14 GPUs. It also enables support for the exFAT filesystem and the open-source WireGuard VPN, as well as integration with Livepatch which allows for reboot-free kernel updates. A new Linux Security Module named Lockdown, disabled by default, was introduced in this kernel release and aims to prevent high-privileged root accounts from interacting with the underlying kernel by restricting certain kernel functionality, disallowing execution of arbitrary code and enforcing kernel module signatures among others.

An updated toolchain offers glibc 2.31, OpenJDK 11, Python 3.8.2, php 7.4, perl 5.30 and Go 1.13. Python 2 is no longer used and has been moved to the universe repository. This release uses GNOME 3.36 which brings improvements to the user interface including a revamped login screen and refreshed Yaru theme. Improvements have also been made to the system menu and the installation screen, which now shows a graphical drive checking routine. Moreover, the OEM logo is now displayed during boot. The Ubuntu Software Center will now install packages from the Snap Store, while it also adds an option for selecting the desired release channel to install from. This release also ended all support for the 32-bit architecture.

The recommended minimum system requirements for the desktop edition of this release are:

 2 GHz dual-core processor
 4 GiB of RAM
 25 GB of hard-drive, USB stick, memory card or external drive space
 VGA capable of 1024x768 screen resolution
 a CD/DVD drive or a USB port for the installer media
 Internet access is desirable, but not essential

Reviewer Joey Sneddon noted in OMG Ubuntu, "tradition dictates that Ubuntu LTS releases play things safer than the interim so-called "short-term releases" by only including features that Ubuntu developers can commit to maintain for at least five years. Focal doesn't buck that trend. But while this means there are few "omg!" changes in 20.04 there are a number of iterative improvements, usability and user interface refinements, and some much needed updates, spread throughout the whole of the system."

Dave McKay, writing for HowToGeek, concluded, "Ubuntu 20.04 Is a Great Release. This is a polished, good-looking, and fast release from Canonical."

Writing in It's FOSS, Abhishek Prakash wrote, "Since it's an LTS release, stability is of the upmost importance. Canonical team is not going to try any radical changes here. Ubuntu 18.04 LTS users would surely notice the visual changes and performance improvements but I don't think you’ll see many changes between 19.10 and 20.04."

In a review in DistroWatch, Jesse Smith detailed a number of problems found in testing this release, including boot issues, the decision to have Ubuntu Software only offer Snaps, which are few in number, slow, use a lot of memory and do not integrate well. He also criticized the ZFS file system for not working correctly and the lack of Flatpak support. He concluded, "these issues, along with the slow boot times and spotty wireless network access, gave me a very poor impression of Ubuntu 20.04. This was especially disappointing since just six months ago I had a positive experience with Xubuntu 19.10, which was also running on ZFS. My experience this week was frustrating - slow, buggy, and multiple components felt incomplete. This is, in my subjective opinion, a poor showing and a surprisingly unpolished one considering Canonical plans to support this release for the next five years."

In a 29 May 2020 review in Full Circle, Adam Hunt concluded, 20.04 was a "virtually flawless release".

Ubuntu 20.10 (Groovy Gorilla) 

Ubuntu 20.10, codenamed Groovy Gorilla, was released on 22 October 2020. This release is based on the Linux kernel 5.8 which introduces support for several modern hardware devices and protocols. Notable features include support for USB4, AMD Zen 3 CPUs and Intel Ice Lake and Tiger Lake graphics as well as initial support for booting Power10 processors. GNOME 3.38 brings enhancements to the core GNOME apps and tweaked the app grid, among other user experience improvements. Ubuntu 20.10 is the first release to feature desktop images for the Raspberry Pi 4 (4GB and 8GB models) and the Compute Module 4. Older Pi models with less memory may still be able to boot but they are not officially supported.

An updated toolchain set includes glibc 2.32, OpenJDK 11, rustc 1.41, GCC 10, LLVM 11, Python 3.8.6, ruby 2.7.0, php 7.4.9, perl 5.30 and golang 1.13. In addition to these, nftables is now the default firewall backend, replacing iptables.

In an October 2020 review in HowToGeek, Dave McKay concluded, "we recommend that most people stick with Ubuntu 20.04 LTS for stability. Ubuntu 20.10 doesn’t offer any huge improvements. Rather, it just shows that Ubuntu is still a solid platform, making good progress toward its next LTS release in 2022 ... Canonical estimates that 95% of Ubuntu installations are LTS versions. If that’s true, then plainly interim builds won’t appeal to many people who use Ubuntu. Even if Canonical’s figures are slightly off, it’s obvious the vast majority prefer stability and guaranteed long-term support over the incremental benefits of interim builds."

Tim Anderson of The Register concluded, "...this is not the biggest of Ubuntu releases but keeps the momentum going for Canonical's distribution, hugely popular for server use on public cloud and becoming more polished for desktop users too."

Bogdan Popa, writing for Softpedia, noted of this release, "Ubuntu was, is, and will probably remain the leading Linux distribution out there, at least as far as the number of users is considered."

A review in Full Circle magazine concluded:

While Ubuntu 20.10 is a really solid release, it has surprisingly few new features for a release that initiates a new Ubuntu development cycle. In many ways this is probably a good sign, though. After 33 releases over 16 years, Ubuntu [is] a very mature Linux distribution and it gets almost everything right. There is not really a lot that needs changing, beyond updating the hardware support for the next generation of computers and also updating the default applications, both of which this release does. These days most Ubuntu users run the current LTS release and only upgrade when a new LTS version comes out. This standard release offers very little to entice most Ubuntu users to switch, especially since it has only nine months of support.

Ubuntu 21.04 (Hirsute Hippo)  

Ubuntu 21.04, codenamed Hirsute Hippo, was released on 22 April 2021.

Ubuntu 21.04 uses the 5.11 Linux kernel, which introduces smartcard authentication and support for Intel's Software Guard Extensions and improves support for AMD CPUs and GPUs. Wayland is now used as the default on hardware, other than those that have Nvidia graphics processors. Support for drag and drop from the file manager to the desktop was also added.

This release was to have used the new GNOME 40 release, but a developer decision was made to retain GNOME 3.38 instead, the same version used in Ubuntu 20.10. This decision was made to give time to address questions about the stability of the GTK4 toolkit, a major GNOME interface redesign and the unknown impact on GNOME extensions and Ubuntu's default Yaru GTK theme.

In a review, Joey Sneddon of OMG Ubuntu, wrote, "Ubuntu 21.04 isn’t a game-changing release. Despite the hirsute moniker there’s little nothing hair-raising included, perhaps save for the switch to Wayland — but even that isn’t as prickly as it used to be! But it’s not a release totally devoid of value. Ubuntu 21.04 features a striking new dark theme and makes a raft of smaller UI tweaks that add up to an impressive, polished whole. There are also new installer features, a new desktop icons experience, and (of course) a new wallpaper."

Dave McKay wrote in How To Geek, "the Hirsute Hippo behaved well in testing and feels like a solid, stable build. What it lacks in surface glitter it makes up for with many significant changes beneath the hood—even without GNOME 40. The 5.11 kernel, refreshed applications, and system-wide bug fixes and security enhancements are all advantageous. The change of permissions on the home directories is a welcome change, too. It’s nothing that you couldn’t do by hand in other releases, but how many actually bothered?"

A review in Full Circle magazine note, "So far in this development cycle we have seen very few substantive changes. Perhaps the most important is the use of Wayland by default. Even though that is a developer accomplishment, it is pretty much 'user-transparent'. So far the next LTS release, 22.04, is shaping up to be very similar to the last LTS release, 20.04, and that is actually a good thing. In a mature distribution that already works well, like Ubuntu, wholesale changes are not needed and would cause a lot of user unhappiness. Ubuntu users today largely like how Ubuntu looks and works and don’t think much in the way of changes are needed. People who don’t like Ubuntu are probably already using something else."

Ubuntu 21.10 (Impish Indri) 

Ubuntu 21.10, codenamed Impish Indri, was released on 14 October 2021.

Ubuntu 21.10 uses the 5.13 Linux kernel, which introduces rudimentary support for Apple M1 chips, FreeSync HDMI support for AMD GPUs, a new ‘Landlock‘ security module and support for several new hardware among other changes and improvements. This release transitions from GNOME 3.38 to GNOME 40, introducing a horizontal workspace switcher and an improved Activities Overview design. The Ubuntu Dock remains vertically placed on the left of the screen and now features separators between pinned and running applications as well as a persistent trash can icon and USB drive shortcuts. A change was made in the default GNOME 40 behavior so that after logging in, the user will be shown the desktop instead of the Activities Overview. Despite Ubuntu 21.10 shipping with GNOME 40, a few GNOME 41 apps are available. A Firefox Snap is now installed by default on Ubuntu 21.10 instead of the deb package, which remains available for the time being.

Furthermore, the Nvidia proprietary drivers now support Wayland sessions. The default Yaru theme was also updated with new icons and Zstd compression was enabled in the main archive, making installations faster.

Joey Sneddon wrote in OMG! Ubuntu!, "for me what makes this release most appealing isn’t a specific one-thing, it’s the aggregate total; the combination of new apps, new kernel, new GNOME Shell, new look, and new installer (though not default for now) make the Impish Indri a particularly inspiring iteration of this iconic distro."

Dave McKay of How-To-Geek wrote in his review, "If you’re an existing user and any of the hardware support or security features of the kernel are going to have a positive impact on your particular use case, then go ahead and update. If you don’t have an issue that is going to be resolved by upgrading, it’s hard to justify the effort—and risk—of an upgrade. Certainly, there’s nothing here to compel an avid LTS user to leave that safe haven and move to 21.10."

Ubuntu 22.04 LTS (Jammy Jellyfish) 

Ubuntu 22.04, codenamed Jammy Jellyfish, was released on 21 April 2022, and is a long-term support release, supported for five years, until April 2027.

Ubuntu 22.04 LTS Desktop uses the 5.17 Linux kernel, with the 5.15 HWE rolling kernel for hardware that does not support the newer kernel. While Ubuntu 22.04 LTS Server uses the 5.15 Linux kernel, and Ubuntu Cloud and Ubuntu for IoT uses an optimized kernel based on the 5.15 Linux kernel. It updates Python to 3.10 and Ruby to 3.0. The init system is systemd 249.11 and the desktop is a mix of GNOME 41 and 42 applications. The default web browser, Firefox is available as a snap package and the release repositories no longer provide an alternative .deb package. This release offers users two Yaru themes, light and dark, but with a choice of ten different accent colors for customization.

In his review of this release, Steven Vaughan-Nichols noted in an article for ZDNet, "all-in-all, I think the new Ubuntu 22.04 is an excellent Linux desktop. Beyond that, it's also a great Linux distribution for almost any purpose."

Joey Sneddon of OMG Ubuntu! termed the release "pretty rad".

Writing for The Register, Richard Speed stated, "those upgrading from 20.04 LTS will find a number of changes to the environment; as well as accent colors that are easier to set and inevitable dark mode enhancements, the arrival of GNOME 42 (and its screenshotting improvements) have made for a slicker, if not revolutionary, desktop appearance."

DistroWatch reviewer Jesse Smith was critical of the release, writing:

"I think the launch of Ubuntu 22.04 is a clear sign Canonical is much more interested in publishing releases on a set schedule than producing something worthwhile. This version was not ready for release and it's is probably going to be a costly endeavour to maintain this collection of mixed versioned software and mixed display server and mixed designs for a full five years. It's a platform I would recommend avoiding."

Ubuntu 22.10 (Kinetic Kudu) 

Ubuntu 22.10, codenamed Kinetic Kudu, is interim release and was made on 20 October 2022.

The release uses the 5.19 Linux kernel, which improves the power efficiency on Intel-based computers and supports multithreaded decompression. It also upgrades the GNOME desktop environment to version 43, with support for GTK4 theming.

Ubuntu 22.10 also adds support for MicroPython on microcontrollers such as the Raspberry Pi Pico W, as well as support for RISC-V processors. It also adds rshell, thonny, and mpremote to the Ubuntu repositories.

In a review in OMG Ubuntu, writer Joey Sneddon stated, "if anything, the Kinetic Kudu is not as energetic as its codename intimates. As interim releases it is a passably interesting yet largely iterative issue. Formulaic? That's not a bad thing. Releases like this are sure-footed foundations on which more ambitious changes can later rest."

Ubuntu 23.04 (Lunar Lobster) 
Ubuntu 23.04 Lunar Lobster is an interim release, scheduled 20 April 2023.

Table of versions

Version timeline

Version end-of-life 
After each version of Ubuntu has reached its end-of-life time, its repositories are removed from the main Ubuntu servers and consequently the mirrors. Older versions of Ubuntu repositories and releases can be found on the old Ubuntu releases website.

See also 
 Debian version history
 Fedora Linux release history
 openSUSE version history

References

External links 

 releases.ubuntu.com – Ubuntu Releases site

Lists of operating systems
Software version histories
Releases